Theodorus "Theo" Hogervorst (born 10 January 1956 in Pijnacker) is a road cyclist from the Netherlands. He competed in the men's team time trial at the 1980 Summer Olympics, finishing 15th. He won the Ronde van Noord-Holland in 1980.

See also
 List of Dutch Olympic cyclists

References

1956 births
Living people
Dutch male cyclists
Olympic cyclists of the Netherlands
Cyclists at the 1980 Summer Olympics
People from Pijnacker-Nootdorp
Cyclists from South Holland
20th-century Dutch people